Flavio Rego da Silva (born 10 June 1973) is a former Brazilian football player and current manager of Diriangen FC.

External links
   
   
   
  

1973 births
Living people
Brazilian footballers
Brazilian football managers
Expatriate football managers in Nicaragua
Footballers from Rio de Janeiro (city)

Association footballers not categorized by position